The Schermerhorn–Drees cabinet was the executive branch of the Dutch Government from 25 June 1945 until 3 July 1946. The cabinet was formed by the christian-democratic Roman Catholic State Party (RKSP), the social-democratic Social Democratic Workers' Party (SDAP) and the social-liberal Free-thinking Democratic League (VDB) by royal decree following the end of World War II. The cabinet was a provisional centrist grand coalition and had a substantial majority in the House of Representatives, with prominent civil engineer Willem Schermerhorn of the Free-thinking Democratic League serving as Prime Minister. Social Democratic Leader Willem Drees served as Deputy Prime Minister and Minister of Social Affairs.

This, the first Dutch cabinet after World War II, was appointed by Queen Wilhelmina just a month after the Netherlands were liberated by the Allied forces. It was a royal cabinet (which means that the cabinet is appointed by the Queen, and is not the result of an election). The States-General of the Netherlands was not yet functional, and would not become so until November 1945.

The cabinet served during the early days of the post-World War II 1940s. Domestically, it initiated recovery and rebuilding, and implemented several major reforms to social security. Internationally, the formation of the United Nations was started and the beginning of the decolonization of the Dutch East Indies.

The Schermerhorn–Drees cabinet consisted of ministers from the SDAP (which in 1946 merged with the VDB and the CDU to become the post-War Labour Party), the CHU minister Dr. Piet Lieftinck (who became a member of the PvdA on 9 February 1946), the ARP and the RKSP (named the KVP on 22 December 1945). Prime Minister Willem Schermerhorn was a member of the VDB, but would later become a member of the PvdA. Deputy Prime Minister Willem Drees was a member of the SDAP.

Cabinet actions 
One of the main tasks of the cabinet was to revive the Dutch economy after the war and to rebuild the devastated infrastructure (ports, railroads, roads). Furthermore the Dutch administration had to be restored. Furthermore the cabinet had to deal with the arrest and prosecution of Dutch war criminals and Dutch collaborators.

Until August 1945 the war against Japan in the Dutch East Indies was also a main objective of the cabinet. After the Japanese surrender the cabinet was faced with the Indonesian nationalists Sukarno and Hatta, who proclaimed the independence of their country.

Another objective of the cabinet was the purification of the black money circuit. During the period the bank accounts in the Netherlands were under investigation by the Ministry of Finance, every Dutch citizen was given 10 guilders by the cabinet, in the Netherlands known as 'Het tientje van Lieftinck' (Lieftinck's tenner), named after the minister of Finance, Dr. Lieftinck.

Cabinet members

Trivia
 Four cabinet members had previous experience as scholars or professors: Willem Schermerhorn (Hydraulic Engineering and Surveying), Louis Beel (Administrative Law), Piet Lieftinck (Financial and Business Economics), Gerard van der Leeuw (History of Religion and Egyptian Language and Hieroglyphs).

References

External links
Official
  Kabinet-Schermerhorn/Drees Parlement & Politiek
  Kabinet-Schermerhorn-Drees Rijksoverheid

Cabinets of the Netherlands
1945 establishments in the Netherlands
1946 disestablishments in the Netherlands
Cabinets established in 1945
Cabinets disestablished in 1946
Caretaker governments
Netherlands in World War II